Taworn Tarwan (born 9 September 1947) is a Thai former cyclist. He competed at the 1972 Summer Olympics and 1976 Summer Olympics.

References

External links
 

1947 births
Living people
Taworn Tarwan
Taworn Tarwan
Cyclists at the 1972 Summer Olympics
Cyclists at the 1976 Summer Olympics
Place of birth missing (living people)
Taworn Tarwan